Whitfield is a ghost town in Graham County, Kansas, United States.

History
The Graham post office was moved to Whitfield in 1879. The post office was discontinued in 1889.

References

Further reading

External links
 Graham County maps: Current, Historic, KDOT

Former populated places in Graham County, Kansas
Former populated places in Kansas